Bike Boy is a 1967 American avant garde film directed by Andy Warhol, and was shown, for initial viewings, at the New Andy Warhol Garrick Theatre, at 152 Bleecker Street, Manhattan, New York City. The film has a bit part by Valerie Solanas.

See also
 Andy Warhol filmography
 List of American films of 1967

References

External links

Bike Boy at WarholStars
J.J. Murphy's short essay on the film

1967 films
1967 independent films
Films directed by Andy Warhol
American independent films
1960s English-language films
1960s American films